The 1976 United States Senate election in Ohio took place on November 2, 1976. Incumbent Republican senator Robert Taft, Jr. ran for re-election to second term. Democrat Howard Metzenbaum, who had briefly served in the Senate in 1974, unseated Taft in a rematch of the 1970 election.

Democratic primary

Candidates
Richard B. Kay, Cleveland attorney and perennial candidate
Howard Metzenbaum, former State Senator from Lyndhurst and interim United States Senator in 1974
James D. Nolan, nominee for Ohio Secretary of State in 1966
James V. Stanton, U.S. Representative from Cleveland

Results

General election

Results

See also 
 1976 United States Senate elections

References

Ohio
1976
1976 Ohio elections